The leoger is a Panthera hybrid between a leopard and a tigress. It is closely related to a tigard. 

Leoger have supposedly appeared many times.   Frederick Codrington Hicks recorded that the weight of these creatures varied from 50 pounds to the weight of a tigress.  In addition, in September 1965, a leoger skin was supposedly put on sale. There are some more documentations of the leoger, but most of them are just of strange-looking skins that could also be attributed to genetic mutations. Most of these reports are probably hoaxes or misinterpretations, which makes it hard for scientists to learn about leogers, but at least a part of the claims are true or in part true, such as the ones made by Frederick Codrington Hicks.

References

Panthera hybrids